Mecolaesthus is a genus of cellar spiders that was first described by Eugène Louis Simon in 1893.

Species
 it contains fourty species, found in South America, Dominica, on Saint Vincent and the Grenadines, Trinidad and Tobago, and Guadeloupe:
Mecolaesthus alegria Huber, 2020 – Venezuela
Mecolaesthus anzu Huber, 2023 – Ecuador
Mecolaesthus arepa Huber, 2020 – Venezuela
Mecolaesthus arima Huber, 2000 – Trinidad
Mecolaesthus azulita Huber, 2000 – Venezuela
Mecolaesthus bienmesabe Huber, 2020 – Venezuela
Mecolaesthus cachapa Huber, 2020 – Venezuela
Mecolaesthus chicha Huber, 2020 – Venezuela
Mecolaesthus chuwitayo Huber, 2023 – Ecuador
Mecolaesthus cordiformis (González-Sponga, 2009) – Venezuela
Mecolaesthus cornutus Huber, 2000 – Venezuela
Mecolaesthus discrepantis (González-Sponga, 2003) – Venezuela
Mecolaesthus fallax Huber, 2020 – Venezuela
Mecolaesthus grandis (González-Sponga, 2009) – Venezuela
Mecolaesthus graphorn Huber, 2020 – Venezuela
Mecolaesthus guasacaca Huber, 2020 – Venezuela
Mecolaesthus hoti Huber, 2000 – Venezuela
Mecolaesthus lechosa Huber, 2020 – Venezuela
Mecolaesthus lemniscatus (Simon, 1894) – St. Vincent
Mecolaesthus limon Huber, 2020 – Venezuela
Mecolaesthus longipes Huber, 2020 – Venezuela
Mecolaesthus longissimus Simon, 1893 (type) – Venezuela
Mecolaesthus misahualli Huber, 2023 – Ecuador
Mecolaesthus mucuy Huber, 2000 – Venezuela
Mecolaesthus multidenticulatus (González-Sponga, 2003) – Venezuela
Mecolaesthus nigrifrons (Simon, 1894) – St. Vincent
Mecolaesthus niquitanus (González-Sponga, 2011) – Venezuela
Mecolaesthus parchita Huber, 2020 – Venezuela
Mecolaesthus peckorum Huber, 2000 – Venezuela
Mecolaesthus piedras Huber, 2020 – Venezuela
Mecolaesthus puntiagudus (González-Sponga, 2003) – Venezuela
Mecolaesthus pusillus Huber, 2020 – Venezuela
Mecolaesthus putumayo Huber, 2000 – Colombia
Mecolaesthus quasimodo Huber, 2023 – Ecuador
Mecolaesthus tabay Huber, 2000 – Venezuela
Mecolaesthus taino Huber, 2000 – Guadeloupe, Dominica
Mecolaesthus trampa Huber, 2020 – Venezuela
Mecolaesthus tuberculosus (González-Sponga, 2009) – Venezuela
Mecolaesthus yawaperi Huber, 2000 – Brazil
Mecolaesthus yerbatero Huber, 2020 – Venezuela

See also
 List of Pholcidae species

References

Araneomorphae genera
Pholcidae
Spiders of South America
Spiders of the Caribbean